False Island Point is a headland  long and  wide, which is connected by a low, narrow, almost invisible isthmus to the south side of Vega Island, lying south of the northeast end of the Antarctic Peninsula. It was first sighted in February 1902 and charted as an island by the Swedish Antarctic Expedition under Otto Nordenskiöld. It was determined to be a part of Vega Island in 1945 by the Falkland Islands Dependencies Survey, who applied this descriptive name.

References 

Headlands of the James Ross Island group